The Great Britain men's national under-18 basketball team is a national basketball team of Great Britain, administered by the British Basketball. It represents the country in international men's under-18 basketball competitions.

FIBA U18 European Championship participations

See also
Great Britain men's national basketball team
Great Britain men's national under-16 basketball team
Great Britain women's national under-18 basketball team

References

External links
 Official website
 Archived records of Great Britain team participations

U
Basketball
Men's national under-18 basketball teams